Astrephomene is a genus of green algae in the family Goniaceae, order Chlamydomonadales. The genus was first described in 1937 by Pocock and named by Pockock in 1953 (Stein 1958).

Taxonomy 
It was formerly placed in the monotypic family Astrephomenaceae. Astrephomenaceae is now considered obsolete, and Astrephomene is now classified within the Goniaceae.

Description 
Astrephomene gubernaculifera is a colonial, flagellated volvocine green algae. It consists of 16, 32, 64 or 128 cells, 2 to 7 of which are small and oriented such that their flagella form a rudder (Stein 1958). Each cell is surrounded by a gelatinous matrix and contains an eyespot, two flagella and 1-3 contractile vacuoles at the anterior end.

Astrephomene gubernaculifera can reproduce sexually or asexually. During asexual reproduction of Astrephomene, rotation of daughter protoplasts occurs in conjunction with the movement of basal bodies during successive cell divisions, ending with the anterior end of all cells of the daughter colony outside after the first nuclear and cytoplasmic division. This type of asexual reproduction is unique among the colonial volvocine green algae (Pocock 1953). By contrast, in Eudorina, protoplast rotation is lacking during successive divisions; a spheroidal colony is formed by means of inversion after successive divisions. Astrephomene gubernaculifera has two mating types that reproduce to form zygotes.

Evolution
Colony inversion is believed to have arisen twice in the order Chlamydomonadales.  Spheroidal colony formation differs between the two lineages: rotation of daughter protoplasts during successive cell divisions in Astrephomene, and inversion after cell divisions in Eudorina.

Habitats 
Astrephomene gubernaculifera is often found in organically rich temporary pools, often in pasture ponds. It typically persists for 1–3 weeks after ponds are formed in beginning of the wet season (Pocock 1953).

It has been collected from South Africa, Australia and the United States (Pocock 1953).

References

Further reading

Scientific journals

External links

Chlamydomonadales genera
Chlamydomonadales